Antanas Pocius (19 August 1913 – 1 April 1983) was Lithuanian choirmaster, organist and composer.

Early life
Antanas Pocius was born on 19 August 1913, in Pagiriai village, close to Tauragė in what was then Russian Empire in a very poor family and received a name of his grandfather, a village musician. A. Pocius was born very weak but survived the infancy nevertheless and was the fifth child in the family. Due to challenging economic conditions, all the children would serve as shepherds, with A. Pocius starting at the age of four. Antanas' father Petras Pocius fought in the First World War and was injured in his lungs, which caused the development of tuberculosis. He died when Antanas Pocius was only 12 years old, leaving the family in even tougher economic conditions after the householder's death.

Music as a vocation 
After having finished three grades at the elementary school, Antanas Pocius started learning the trade of tailor until he realised he would do better as an organist, as organs had been attracting his attention since an early age. He started taking classes with S. Batoras, an organist in Eržvilkas.

From 1940 to 1942 A. Pocius worked as an organist in Virbalis; in 1942 he started studying at the Kaunas Conservatory. From 1962 to 1966 he worked at the music school in Plungė as a teacher, and later, from 1966 to 1976, at the Plungė Academy of Music. He would then lead the Pensioners' choir from 1977 until 1981.

Antanas Pocius died on 1 April 1983, in the Rietavas hospital and was buried in Plungė.

Pieces and songs 
Antanas Pocius created many pieces of music and wrote lyrics to some of them, such as Sidabrinė jaunystė (Silver Youth) and Plungės parkas (Plungė Park), among others.

1913 births
1983 deaths
People from Jurbarkas District Municipality
People from Kovno Governorate
People from Plungė
20th-century composers